The Ngarinyin language, also known as Ungarinjin and Eastern Worrorran, is an endangered Australian Aboriginal language of the Kimberley region of Western Australia spoken by the Ngarinyin people.

Classification and naming 
Ngarinyin is one of the Worrorran languages, along with Wunambal and (Western) Worrowan.

It is itself a dialect cluster, and may be considered more than a single language; Robert M. W. Dixon lists Guwidj (Orla), Waladja (Worla), Ngarnawu, Andadjin, Munumburru, Wolyamidi, and Waladjangarri (Waladjangari) as dialects. Claire Bowern (2011) lists Ngarinyin, Andajin, and Worla.

According to Rumsey, Ngarinyin may be applied to either the language or the people who speak it, whereas Ungarinyin only refers to the language. McGregor reported that "Ngarinyin has been chosen as the preferred language name" by the community.

Usage 

With only 38 people recorded as speaking the language at home in the 2016 Australian census, Ngarinyin is considered a critically endangered and currently  moribund language, though there are efforts being made to documenting speech and grammar structures before it becomes extinct, including the specifics on the terms of the kinship system of the language.

Ngarinyin is found only within the local region of Northern Kimberley, Australia, and other local languages are found in the surrounding region instead due to the small population of Ngarinyin speakers, including the Worrorran languages of Wunambal and Worrorra. Ngarinyin is found at the centre of the region, and the other Aboriginal languages in the area face similar levels of endangerment.  Ngarinyin was previously one of the most prevalent of the Aboriginal languages in Northern Kimberley, but it has since become a language known only by a small number of the elderly.

Kriol is often used by younger generations instead of Ngarinyin, though some knowledge of the language is still retained by these people.

Kinship terms
Ngarinyin places great emphasis on the classification of family members and is similar to the neighbouring Aboriginal languages of Worrorra and Wunambal to the point of being virtually identical, though it is still considered unusual among those that study kinship systems of Aboriginal languages. One of the most noticeable features of this system is the use of identical terms given to kin usually separated by generation level. For instance, the titles wife's brother, wife's father and wife's father's father in English all share the same title of waiingi in Ngarinyin.

Phonology

Vowels

Consonants

Notes

Sources

McConvell, P., Keen, I., & Henderey, R. (2013). 7. The Evolution of Yolngu and Ngarinyin Kinship Terminologies. In, Kinship Systems: Change and Reconstruction (132). University of Utah Press.

Further reading
  Text may be copied from this source, which is available under a Attribution 4.0 International  (CC BY 4.0) licence.

Worrorran languages
Endangered indigenous Australian languages in Western Australia
Kimberley (Western Australia)